The following is a list of 1995 Seattle Mariners draft picks. The Mariners took part in the June regular draft, also known as the Rule 4 draft. The Mariners made 77 selections in the 1995 draft, the first being outfielder José Cruz Jr. in the first round. In all, the Mariners selected 37 pitchers, 20 outfielders, 8 catchers, 6 shortstops, 3 first basemen, 2 third basemen, and 1 second baseman.

Draft

Key

Table

References
General references

Inline citations

External links
Seattle Mariners official website